Dance to the Duke! is an album by American pianist, composer and bandleader Duke Ellington recorded for the Capitol label in 1953. The album has not been released on CD but the tracks have appeared on The Complete Capitol Recordings of Duke Ellington released by Mosaic Records in 1995.

Reception
The Allmusic review awarded the album 3 stars.

Track listing
:All compositions by Duke Ellington except as indicated
 "C Jam Blues" - 4:52
 "Orson" (Ellington, Billy Strayhorn) - 2:37  
 "Caravan" (Juan Tizol) - 4:32
 "Kinda Dukish" - 2:32
 "Bakiff" - 5:48
 "Frivolous Banta" (Rick Henderson) - 2:39 
 "Things Ain't What They Used To Be" (Mercer Ellington) - 6:22
 "Night Time" (Ellington, Strayhorn) - 2:53 
Recorded at Capitol Studios, Los Angeles on April 7, 1953 (track 2), December 28, 1953 (track 8), and September 1, 1954 (track 5), in San Francisco on April 26, 1954 (track 1) and in Chicago on January 1, 1954 (track 6), January 2, 1954 (track 7) and October 8, 1954 (track 3).

Personnel
Duke Ellington – piano
Cat Anderson, Willie Cook, Ray Nance, Clark Terry, Gerald Wilson (tracks 1 & 5) - trumpet
Quentin Jackson, George Jean (tracks 6-8), Juan Tizol (track 2), Britt Woodman - trombone
John Sanders - valve trombone (tracks 1, 3 & 5)
Russell Procope - alto saxophone, clarinet
Rick Henderson - alto saxophone 
Paul Gonsalves - tenor saxophone
Jimmy Hamilton - clarinet, tenor saxophone
Harry Carney - baritone saxophone, bass clarinet
Wendell Marshall (tracks 1, 2, & 4-8), Oscar Pettiford (track 3) - bass 
Butch Ballard (track 2), Dave Black  - drums (tracks 1 & 3-8)
Ralph Collier - congas (tracks 1 & 5)
Frank Rollo - bongos (track 3)

References

Capitol Records albums
Duke Ellington albums
1953 albums